The optical metric was defined by German theoretical physicist Walter Gordon in 1923  to study the geometrical optics in curved space-time filled with moving dielectric materials. 

Let  be the normalized (covariant) 4-velocity of the arbitrarily-moving dielectric medium filling the space-time, and assume that the fluid’s electromagnetic properties are linear, isotropic, transparent, nondispersive, and can be summarized by two scalar functions: a dielectric permittivity  and a magnetic permeability . 

Then the optical metric tensor is defined as

where  is the physical metric tensor.

The inverse (contravariant) optical metric tensor is

where  is the contravariant 4-velocity of the moving fluid.

Properties 

An important fact about Gordon's optical metric is that in curved space-time filled with dielectric material, electromagnetic waves (under geometrical optics approximation) follows geodesics of the optical metric instead of the physical metric. 
Consequently, the study of geometric optics in curved space-time with dielectric material can sometimes be simplified by using optical metric (note that the dynamics of the physical system is still described by the physical metric).
For example, optical metric can be used to study the radiative transfer in stellar atmospheres around compact astrophysical objects such as neutron stars and white dwarfs, and in accretion disks around black holes.
In cosmology, optical metric can be used to study the distance-redshift relation in cosmological models in which the intergalactic or interstellar medium have a non-vanishing refraction index.

History 

After the original introduction of the concept of optical metric by Gordon in 1923, the mathematical formalism of optical metric was further investigated by Jürgen Ehlers  in 1967 including a detailed discussion of the geometrical optical approximation in curved space-time and the optical scalars transport equation. 
Gordon's optical metric was extended by Bin Chen and Ronald Kantowski to include light absorption. 
The original real optical metric was consequently extended into a complex one.

Applications 

The first application of Gordon's optical metric theory to cosmology was also made by  Bin Chen and Ronald Kantowski.

The absorption corrected distance-redshift relation in the homogeneous and isotropic Friedman-Lemaitre-Robertson-Walker (FLRW) universe is called Gordon-Chen-Kantowski formalism  and can be used to study the absorption of intergalactic medium (or cosmic opacity) in the Universe.

For example, the physical metric for a Robertson-Walker spacetime can be written (using the metric signature (-,+,+,+)) 

On the other hand, the optical metric for Robertson-Walker Universe filled with rest homogeneous refraction material is

where  the cosmic-time dependent refraction index.

The luminosity distance-redshift relation in a Flat FLRW universe with dark absorption can be written

A non-zero cosmic opacity will render the standard candles such as Type Ia supernovae appear dimmer than expected from a transparent Universe. 
This can be used as an alternative explanation of the observed apparent acceleration of the cosmic expansion.

Analogue gravity 

In analog models of gravity, the "Gordon form" expresses the metric for a curved spacetime as the sum of a flat (Minkowski) metric and a 4-velocity field u:

where n is the refractive index. This is analogous to Kerr-Schild form, which uses a null vector field in place of timelike. An open question is which spacetimes can be expressed in this way. The challenge is to pick coordinate systems for which the above relationship holds. Schwarzschild spacetime, which describes a non-rotating black hole, can be expressed this way. There has been progress for Kerr spacetime which describes a rotating black hole, but this case remains elusive.

Electrodynamics in media residing in curved space-times 
On the other hand, general relativity is formulated in the language of 4-dimensional tensors. To obtain the tensorial optical metric, medium properties such as permittivity, permeability, and magnetoelectric couplings must first be promoted to 4-dimensional covariant tensors, and the electrodynamics of light propagation through such media residing within a background space-time must also be expressed in a compatible 4-dimensional way. Here, electrodynamic fields will be described in terms of differential forms, exterior algebra, and the exterior derivative. Similar to the way that 3-vectors are denoted with an arrow, as in  4-dimensional tensors will be denoted by bold symbols, for example  The musical isomorphisms will be used to indicate raising and lowering of indices with the metric, and a dot notation is used to denote contraction on adjacent indices, e.g.

The fundamental quantity of electrodynamics is the potential 1-form  from which the field strength tensor is the 2-form  From the nilpotency of the exterior derivative one immediately has the homogeneous Maxwell equations  while a variation of the Yang-Mills action  with respect to  provides the inhomogeneous Maxwell equations  where  is the charge-current 3-form.  Within dielectric media there exist charges bound up in otherwise neutral atoms.  These charges are not free to move around very much, but distortions to the distribution of charge within the atom can allow dipole (or more generally multipole) moments to form, with which is associated a dipole field.  Separating bound and free charges in the charge-current three form  the bound source is associated with a particular solution called the polarization field  satisfying  One may then write  with the constitutive equation In linear media, the dipole moment is induced by the incident free field in such a way that the polarization field is linearly proportional to the free field,  (in indices this is ).  Then the constitutive equation can be written  The  tensor  is antisymmetric in each pair of indices, and the vacuum is seen to be a trivial dielectric such that  This means that the distribution of dielectric material within the curved background space-time can be completely described functionally by giving  and smooth transitions from vacuum into media can be described.

Let  be the contravariant velocity 4-vector of the observer. Then one may define the covariant 1-forms  The corresponding 3-vectors are obtained in Minkowski space-time by taking the purely spatial (relative to the observer) parts of the contravariant versions of these 1-forms. Since each of the 1-form fields defined above is also transverse to  we may conclude that each  is an automorphism of a subspace of the cotangent space defined by orthogonality with respect to the observer. In other words, everything operates in the observer's purely spatial 3-dimensional space. In terms of these parameters,  is found to be Although the set of 1-form constitutive equations shown above are the ones that follow most naturally from the covariant 2-form constitutive equation , they are not the only possibility. In Minkowski space-time, the space-space part (relative to observer ) of each of these tensors is equivalent to the traditional  constitutive matrices of 3-vector electrodynamics. In terms of this alternative set of constitutive tensors,  is found to be  Here,  is a projection operator that annihilates any tensor components parallel to  Since  then  also serves as the Kronecker delta on the subspace orthogonal to  In the vacuum,

Geometric optics and the optical metric 
Therefore, any non-trivial solutions must reside in the 3-dimensional subspace orthogonal to  so the tensor  is effectively only 3-dimensional. Thus, the determinant condition is insufficient to provide any information. Since in this case  but  is arbitrary, one obtains the secondary condition  Notice that the adjugate of a matrix is still a matrix, so the scalar determinant condition has now been replaced by a matrix condition. What has been shown so far is that wave solutions of Maxwell's equations, in the ray limit, must satisfy one of these two polynomial conditions. The tensors  therefore determine the lightcone structures. The fact that there are two of them implies a double light cone structure - one for each of the two polarization states, i.e. birefringence. In vacuum, it is readily found that  degenerates to the space-time metric. Since the  determine the lightcones in media in the way that  does for the vacuum, they are referred to as optical metrics. However, it is perhaps more appropriate to take the point of view that the space-time metric happens to also serve as the optical metric in vacuum, which is not so surprising considering that the space-time metric is the only available structure in vacuum.

These pseudo-Finslerian optical metrics degenerate to a common, non-birefringent, pseudo-Riemannian optical metric for media that obey a curved space-time generalization of the Post conditions.

References

Effects of gravitation
Spacetime
Gravitational lensing
Theory of relativity